Steven M. Block (born 1952) is an American biophysicist and Professor at Stanford University with a joint appointment in the departments of Biology and Applied Physics. In addition, he is a member of the scientific advisory group JASON, a senior fellow of Stanford's Freeman Spogli Institute for International Studies, and an amateur bluegrass musician. Block received his B.A. and M.A. from Oxford University. He has been elected to the U.S. National Academy of Sciences (2007) and the American Academy of Arts and Sciences (2000), and is a winner of the Max Delbruck Prize of the American Physical Society (2008), as well as the Single Molecule Biophysics Prize of the Biophysical Society (2007). He served as President of the Biophysical Society during 2005-6. His graduate work was completed in the laboratory of Howard Berg at the University of Colorado and Caltech. He received his Ph.D. in 1983 and went on to do postdoctoral research at Stanford.  Since that time, Block has held positions at the Rowland Institute for Science, Harvard University, and Princeton University before returning to Stanford in 1999.

As a graduate student, Block picked apart the adaptation kinetics involved in bacterial chemotaxis. As an independent scientist, Block has pioneered the use of optical tweezers, a technique developed by Arthur Ashkin, to study biological enzymes and polymers at the single-molecule level. Work in his lab has led to the direct observation of the 8 nm steps taken by kinesin and the sub-nanometer stepping motions of RNA polymerase on a DNA template. While consulting for the United States government through JASON, Block has researched the many threats associated with bioterrorism and headed influential studies on how advances in genetic engineering have impacted biological warfare.

Selected publications

References

External links
 Steven Block Profile
 Block Lab Website

1952 births
Living people
University of Colorado alumni
Harvard University faculty
Princeton University faculty
Stanford University Department of Biology faculty
Stanford University Department of Applied Physics faculty
Members of the United States National Academy of Sciences
Members of JASON (advisory group)
Alumni of the University of Oxford
Fellows of the American Academy of Arts and Sciences
Presidents of the Biophysical Society
Fellows of the American Physical Society